Red Tower may refer to:

Structures
 Red Tower (Alanya), a 13th-century building in Alanya, Turkey
 Red Tower (Pärnu), a 15th-century tower in Pärnu, Estonia
 Red Tower (York), a 15th-century tower in York, England
 Bengħisa Tower, a small 17th-century watchtower in Malta (now demolished)
 Saint Agatha's Tower, a large 17th-century watchtower in Malta
 Bissell Street Water Tower, a 19th-century standpipe water tower in College Hill, St. Louis, Missouri, U.S
 Torre Rossa, an ancient tower in Asti, Italy
 A Roman sepulchral monument in Fiumefreddo di Sicilia

Other uses
 The Red Tower, a setting in the 2000 novel The Fall by Garth Nix
 The Red Tower, a 1913 painting by Giorgio de Chirico